SolungAvisa is a local newspaper published in Flisa, Norway. It covers Grue, Åsnes og Våler.

It was established by the owners of Østlendingen as Avisen Solungen in 2008. The newspaper Glåmdalen protested against the name, since they on 29 February 2008 had applied to the Norwegian Industrial Property Office for the right of the name Solungen, which was a newspaper they had absorbed in 1915. The owners of Avisen Solungen were persuaded (through a settlement) to use the name SolungAvisa.

References

External links
Official site 

Publications established in 2008
2008 establishments in Norway
Newspapers published in Norway
Mass media in Hedmark
Åsnes